Johanna Fernanda Chamorro (born 27 April 1992) is an Argentine footballer who plays as a midfielder for Racing Club de Avellaneda. She was a member of the Argentina women's national team.

International career
Chamorro represented Argentina at the 2012 FIFA U-20 Women's World Cup. She made her senior debut during the 2014 Copa América Femenina on 12 September that year in a 0–1 loss to Chile.

References

1992 births
Living people
People from General San Martín Partido
Sportspeople from Buenos Aires Province
Argentine women's footballers
Women's association football midfielders
Club Atlético Huracán footballers
Esporte Clube Taubaté players
Santa Cruz Futebol Clube players
Sport Club do Recife players
Racing Club de Avellaneda footballers
Argentina women's international footballers
Argentine expatriate women's footballers
Argentine expatriate sportspeople in Brazil
Expatriate women's footballers in Brazil